Hemp protein is a plant-derived protein from the cannabis plant and is isolated from hemp seeds (a type of nut). The protein in hemp seeds is made up of the two highly digestible globular types of proteins, edestin (60–80%) and 2S albumin, with edestin also being rich in the essential amino acids. 

Dehulled hemp seeds (also known as hemp nuts, hemp kernels or hemp hearts) have a PDCAAS score of 0.66 (the limiting amino acid being lysine, with a digestibility of 92.1%). Observations of limiting enzymatic hydrolysis elicited by trypsin in a controlled environment have show an increase in hemp protein isolate (HSI) solubility at  various pH and a notable decrease in the recorded emulsifying activity index.

See also
Pea protein
Soy protein
Protein quality

References

Bodybuilding supplements
Cannabis foods
Dietary supplements
Hemp products
Nutrition
Proteins